Ratvaj is a village and municipality in Sabinov District in the Prešov Region of north-eastern Slovakia.

History
In historical records the village was first mentioned in 1374.

Geography
The municipality lies at an altitude of 430 metres and covers an area of 5.311 km2. It has a population of about 143 people.

External links
http://www.statistics.sk/mosmis/eng/run.html

Villages and municipalities in Sabinov District